The BRM Aero Bristell NG 5, now called the Bristell Classic, is a Czech low-wing, two-seat in side-by-side configuration, single engine in tractor configuration, ultralight and light-sport aircraft that was designed by Milan Bristela and is produced by BRM Aero. The aircraft is supplied as a complete ready-to-fly aircraft.

The aircraft was introduced at the AERO Friedrichshafen 2011 show, where the retractable gear version was shown.

Design and development
The aircraft was designed to comply with both European microlight rules and also the US light-sport aircraft regulations, by using different versions for each regulatory environment.

The wings feature flaps. , the available engine options were the  Rotax 912ULS, the  Rotax 912 iS Sport and the  Rotax 915 iS. Previous engines offered included the  Rotax 912UL, the  Rotax 912ULS, the  ULPower UL260i/iS, the  ULPower UL350iS, the  Rotax 914,  Jabiru 2200 and  Jabiru 3300 powerplants. The landing gear is of tricycle configuration.

After 42 examples had been completed, the aircraft was introduced into the US market in September 2011 at the AOPA Summit. By 31 December 2020, the company reported over 600 had been delivered.

Variants

Bristell NG 5 UL
Bristell NG 5 HD
Bristell NG 5 LSA
Bristell NG 5 RG
Bristell NG 5 Speed Wing
Homebuilt variant supplied as a kit which can be completed as either a tricycle or conventional landing gear and a choice of engine: Rotax 912S, Rotax 912ULS or Jabuiru 3300A.

Accidents and incidents

Centre of gravity and spin accidents
In February 2020, the Australian Civil Aviation Safety Authority released a safety notice advising of a number of fatal accidents globally involving spins and stalls of Bristell LSAs. The safety notice states "aircraft may not meet the LSA standards as it does not appear to have been adequately tested" and that "the manufacturer has been unable to provide satisfactory evidence that the design is compliant with the requirements of the ASTM standards applicable to light sport aircraft."  The company contested the CASA notice and claims that spin testing was conducted, although the manufacturer prohibits the design from intentional spins. CASA indicated on 28 February 2020 that "further investigation and discussions with the manufacturer are ongoing and CASA will provide an update as new information becomes available."

The Irish Air Accident Investigation Unit report in May 2022 on the crash of an NG 5 Speed Wing in June 2019, resulting in the death of the two occupants,  and found that incorrect weight and balance information supplied by the manufacturer was a contributory factor to the crash and recommended that BRM Aero revise and enhance the operating guidelines for the aircraft.

On 21 June 2021 CASA issued a notice indicating that the manufacturer had provided data on spin testing and had also amended its weight and balance information provided to builders and owners, including changing the datum from the wing leading edge to the engine firewall. CASA indicated that the amended weight and balance limits and new datum adequately addressed the safety concerns previously raised and "provided operators of the aircraft only operate the aircraft in compliance with the corrected AOI data, CASA considers that the potential for inadvertent operation of the aircraft at or outside the centre of gravity limits is substantially reduced."

Specifications (Bristell UL)

See also

References

External links

2010s Czech sport aircraft
2010s Czech ultralight aircraft
Light-sport aircraft
Low-wing aircraft
Single-engined tractor aircraft
Aircraft first flown in 2010
NG 5
Homebuilt aircraft